Dwarf sirens are eel-like salamanders of the genus Pseudobranchus.  Dwarf sirens possess external gills throughout adulthood and lack hind legs.  Dwarf sirens can be distinguished from members of the genus Siren in that dwarf sirens have three toes on each foot rather than four.  Like sirens, dwarf sirens are restricted to the Southeastern United States.

Species
The genus Pseudobranchus consists of the following extant species:

Southern dwarf siren (P. axanthus)
Narrow-striped dwarf siren  (P. a. axanthus)
Everglades dwarf siren  (P. a. belli)
Northern dwarf siren (P. striatus)
Broad-striped dwarf siren  (P. s. striatus)
Gulf Hammock dwarf siren  (P. s. lustricolus)
Slender dwarf siren  (P. s. spheniscus)

There are also two extinct species known from fossil evidence:

 †Pseudobranchus vetustus (Miocene to Pliocene of Florida)
 †Pseudobranchus robustus (Pleistocene of Florida)

References

External links

Pseudobranchus - Encyclopedia of Life

Sirenoidea
Taxa named by John Edward Gray